Tanudan, officially the Municipality of Tanudan  is a 4th class municipality in the province of Kalinga, Philippines. According to the 2020 census, it has a population of 8,746 people.

The town is known for Mount Binaratan. Legend tells that the supreme god of the Kalinga people went into the mountain to hunt but was irritated due to the noises made by the birds, so he ordered the birds to be quiet. When he was done hunting, he forgot to revoke his order from the birds, and thus, the mountain kept silent for all of eternity. Another popular place is the Lubo Village where houses are intact and strategically surrounded with rice terraces. Legend says that a brave warrior challenge god and that no one is stronger than him. So god started building dam that is made of rocks, when the water is high enough, god released the water through a whole called "lubu" that flooded the warrior and his family. The people from Ga-ang and Dacalan gathered together with the remnants of the relatives of the said warrior and saw that the flooded soil was good for planting rice, so they started to cultivating the land and named the village "Lubo".

Geography

Barangays
Tanudan is politically subdivided into 16 barangays. These barangays are headed by elected officials: Barangay Captain, Barangay Council, whose members are called Barangay Councilors. All are elected every three years.

Climate

Demographics

Economy

Government
Tanudan, belonging to the lone congressional district of the province of Kalinga, is governed by a mayor designated as its local chief executive and by a municipal council as its legislative body in accordance with the Local Government Code. The mayor, vice mayor, and the councilors are elected directly by the people through an election which is being held every three years.

Elected officials

References

External links
 [ Philippine Standard Geographic Code]
Philippine Census Information
Local Governance Performance Management System

Municipalities of Kalinga (province)